Eastgate is an unincorporated community in western Liberty County, Texas, United States.

Education
Eastgate is zoned to schools in the Dayton Independent School District.

References

External links

Unincorporated communities in Liberty County, Texas
Unincorporated communities in Texas